The 2014 Sparkassen Open was a professional tennis tournament played on clay courts. It was the 21st edition of the tournament which was part of the 2014 ATP Challenger Tour. It took place in Braunschweig, Germany between 30 June and 5 July 2014.

Singles main-draw entrants

Seeds

 1 Rankings are as of June 24, 2014.

Other entrants
The following players received wildcards into the singles main draw:
  Andrey Golubev
  Maximilian Marterer
  Philipp Petzschner
  Alexander Zverev

The following players received entry as a special exempt into the singles main draw:
  Nikola Ćaćić

The following players received entry as an alternate into the singles main draw:
  Uladzimir Ignatik
  Jaroslav Pospíšil
  Martín Alund

The following players received entry from the qualifying draw:
  Jozef Kovalík
  Nils Langer
  Philipp Davydenko
  André Ghem

The following player received entry as a lucky loser:
  Boris Pašanski

Doubles main-draw entrants

Seeds

1 Rankings as of June 24, 2014.

Other entrants
The following pairs received wildcards into the doubles main draw:
  Michal Konečný /  Marek Pešička
  Sriram Balaji /  Philipp Petzschner
  Daniel Masur /  Alexander Zverev

Champions

Singles

 Alexander Zverev def.  Paul-Henri Mathieu, 1–6, 6–1, 6–4

Doubles

  Andreas Siljeström /  Igor Zelenay def.  Rameez Junaid /  Michal Mertiňák, 7–5, 6–4

External links
Official Website

Sparkassen Open
Sparkassen Open
2014 in German tennis